AnnaSophia Robb (born December 8, 1993) is an American actress, model, mother of two, and singer. She began as a child actress on television, making her leading debut as the titular role in Samantha: An American Girl Holiday (2004). She made her feature film debut in Because of Winn-Dixie (2005), followed by the supporting role of Violet Beauregarde in Tim Burton's Charlie and the Chocolate Factory (2005). Her performance as Leslie Burke in Bridge to Terabithia (2007) garnered her recognition and praise, and two Young Artist Awards. Her subsequent film roles include  Race to Witch Mountain (2009), Soul Surfer (2011), and The Way Way Back (2013). She received wider recognition and praise for playing the lead role of Carrie Bradshaw on The CW's series The Carrie Diaries (2013–2014). In 2019, she played the role of Gypsy Blanchard's neighbor Lacey in the Hulu miniseries The Act.

Early life
Robb was born in Denver, Colorado, the only child of Janet, an interior designer, and David Robb, an architect. She was named after her maternal great-grandmother, Anna Sophie, and her paternal grandmother, Anna Marie. Robb is of Danish, English, Irish, Scottish, and Swedish descent. She grew up in a devout Christian home and was home-schooled. She started taking an interest in acting and began by performing in front of people on her church stage. She competed in dance and gymnastics for four and a half years, but quit to focus on acting. She attended Arapahoe High School in Centennial, Colorado and graduated in 2012.

Career
At age eight, Robb was scouted by an agent, and she and her mother drove to Los Angeles. After several auditions, Robb was invited to appear in a national commercial for Bratz dolls. After appearing in a commercial for McDonald's, Robb had a small role in "Number One Fan", an episode of the television series Drake & Josh. Her first major role was the title character in the television special Samantha: An American Girl Holiday.

Robb's two big-screen appearances in 2005 were adaptations of popular children's books. She starred as Opal in Because of Winn-Dixie, and as Violet Beauregarde in Tim Burton's remake of Charlie and the Chocolate Factory. The latter was a major box office success worldwide, and helped escalate Robb's popularity among preteen audiences.

In 2005, Robb was the face of Trad Clothing, helping to design and model a fashion line for girls. In 2006, she had a guest role on the cartoon show Danny Phantom as the voice of Danielle "Dani" Fenton. Robb played Leslie Burke in Bridge to Terabithia with Josh Hutcherson, which opened in U.S. theaters on February 16, 2007. She recorded a song for the soundtrack titled, "Keep Your Mind Wide Open", and the accompanying video received rotation on the Disney Channel. The song peaked at number 90 on the Billboard Hot 100 during the week of March 1, 2007, giving Robb her first charting single. Robb was a fan of the book before being cast in the role, saying that it "touched me in a way I hadn't been touched by a book before".

Robb went on to appear in The Reaping; Have Dreams, Will Travel; Jumper; and Spy School. Despite negative reviews of the film overall, Robb's performance in Sleepwalking garnered praise. Time film critic Richard Schickel said: "There is a wonderful range to Robb's work...this is extraordinarily mature acting from someone this young and she wins our sympathy without once begging for it." In 2008, she recorded the voice of Mary Magdalene in The Word of Promise: Next Generation – New Testament: Dramatized Audio Bible. She also starred in Race to Witch Mountain (2009). In 2010, she appeared in The Space Between. She then starred in Soul Surfer, playing Bethany Hamilton, who continued to surf after losing her arm in a shark attack.

In May 2011, Robb was announced to star as Wendy Darling in Pan, but later dropped out of the project. It was reported on February 3, 2012, that Robb had landed a role in Life at These Speeds. Later that month, Robb was cast as the young Carrie Bradshaw in The CW's Sex and the City prequel, The Carrie Diaries, and appeared in the teen comedy, The Way, Way Back.

In October 2013, Robb started filming for A Conspiracy on Jekyll Island, starring alongside Frank Grillo, Ed Westwick, Dianna Agron, John Leguizamo, Minnie Driver, and Maggie Q. The film is directed by Aram Rappaport and produced by Hilary Shor, Atit Shah, and Aaron Becker. It was released as The Crash in 2017.

Robb played the role of Alice Green in the PBS Civil War historical drama series Mercy Street from 2016 to 2017.

Personal life
Robb enrolled at New York University in 2014 and graduated in 2018. On September 7, 2021, Robb announced her engagement to her boyfriend Trevor Paul on Instagram. They married a year later, on September 10, 2022, in a three-day celebration within the Catskill and Shawangunk Mountains in New York state.

Filmography

Film
{|class="wikitable sortable"
|-
!Year
!Title
!Role
!class="unsortable"|Notes
!class="unsortable"|
|-
| rowspan=2|2005
|Because of Winn-Dixie
|India "Opal" Buloni
|
|
|-
|Charlie and the Chocolate Factory
|Violet Beauregarde
|
|
|-
| rowspan="3" |2007
|Bridge to Terabithia
|Leslie Burke
|
|
|-
|
|Loren McConnell
|
|
|-
|Have Dreams, Will Travel
|Cassie "Cass" Kennington
|
|
|-
| rowspan=3|2008
|Jumper
|Young Millie Harris
|
|
|-
|Spy School
|Jackie Hoffman
|
|
|-
|Sleepwalking
|Tara Reedy
|
|
|-
|2009
|Race to Witch Mountain
|Sara
|
|
|-
|2010
|
|Samantha "Sam" Jean McLeod
|
|
|-
|2011
|Soul Surfer
|Bethany Hamilton
|
|
|-
| rowspan=2|2013
|
|Susanna Thompson
|
|
|-
|Khumba
|Tombi
|Voice
|
|-
|2014
|Funny or Die: Sofia Coppola's Little Mermaid
|Ariel
|Short film
|
|-
|2016
|Jack of the Red Hearts
|Jacqueline "Jack" Ferguson
|
|
|-
|2017
|
|Creason Clifton
|Direct-to-video
|
|-
| rowspan=2|2018
|Freak Show
|Mary Jane (Blah Blah Blah)
|
|
|-
|Down a Dark Hall
|Katherine "Kit" Gordy
|
|
|-
|2019
|Roger Vivier's Jewels to Shoes
|Acting Student
|Short-film
|
|-
|2020
|Words on Bathroom Walls
|Rebecca
|
|
|-
| rowspan="2" |2021
|Goodnight Darling
|N/A
|Short-film
|
|-
|Lansky
|Anne Lansky
|
|
|-
|TBA
|Rebel Ridge
|TBA
|Post-production
|
|}

Television

Music videos

Soundtrack appearance

Awards and nominations
On March 30, 2008, Robb won her first career award when she was named Leading Young Actress at the Young Artist Awards for her role in Bridge to Terabithia. The film itself won a Young Cast award. On April 24, 2009, she received the Horizon Award'' at the 14th Annual Palm Beach International Film Festival. She was awarded the Rising Star Award at the Denver Film Festival on November 12, 2009.

References

External links

 
 
 

1993 births
21st-century American actresses
21st-century American singers
21st-century American women singers
Actresses from Denver
American anti-racism activists
American child actresses
American child singers
American Christians
American film actresses
American television actresses
American voice actresses
American people of Danish descent
American people of English descent
American people of Irish descent
American people of Scottish descent
American people of Swedish descent
American women's rights activists
Christians from Colorado
American LGBT rights activists
Living people
New York University Gallatin School of Individualized Study alumni